Karawata nigribracteata is a species of flowering plant in the family Bromeliaceae, native to Brazil (the state of Bahia). It was first described in 2014 as Aechmea nigribracteata.

References

Bromelioideae
Flora of Brazil
Plants described in 2014